Belgian horse may refer to:

 American Belgian Draft, an American breed of horse
 Belgian Draught, a Belgian breed of heavy horse
 Belgian Sport Horse, a Belgian breed of warmblood horse
 Belgian Warmblood, a Belgian breed of warmblood horse
 Zangersheide, a Belgian breed of warmblood horse